August Christian Niemann (30 January 1761 – 21 May 1832) was a German forestry engineer and political economist. 
He is known as a composer and collector of student songs.

Born in Altona,  he studied law in Jena and Kiel.
Serving as Hofmeister for a fellow student of noble background, he moved to the University of Göttingen in 1782.
He returned to Kiel in 1783, where he received his PhD, and lectured on statistics and political science from 1785.

His "academic songbook" (Akademisches Liederbuch), published in 1782, contained some of his own compositions. It was successful, a second volume being published in 1795. Niemann's song Landesvater, Schutz und Rater became standard part of the Landesvater ceremony, a ritual pledge of friendship practiced by German academic fraternities. 
He was also the first to set German-language lyrics to the tune of "God Save the King", in his "Heil, unserm Bunde Heil", a patriotic song and early expression of Pan-German nationalism. This example would be imitated in various German patriotic songs and anthems during the 19th century, most notably in "Heil dir im Siegerkranz", the royal anthem of Prussia and later the imperial anthem of the German Empire.

Niemann became extraordinary professor at Kiel University, director of the newly formed forestry institute, in 1787.
He was made ordinary professor in 1794, and he served as rector of Kiel University in the academic years 1811/12 and  1829/30.
Niemann established the Kiel tree nursery (Forstbaumschule Kiel) in 1788.

Niemann was active co-founder of a charitable organisation supporting the poor, the Gesellschaft freiwilliger Armenfreunde.
The city of Kiel named  Niemannsweg in his honour, on 4 June 1869.

Bibliography
Songbooks
1782  Akademisches Liederbuch
1783 Notenbuch zu des akademischen Liederbuchs erstem Bändchen
1795 Akademisches Liederbuch, vol. 2
1825 Wald und Wild: Allgemeines Liederbuch für Deutschlands Forst- und Weidmänner

Political economy
1784  Von der Industrie, ihren Hindernissen und Beförderungsmitteln
1796 Grundsätze der Staatswirthschaft 
1796 Übersicht der Sicherungsmittel gegen Feuersgefahren und Feuersbrünste 
1799 Handbuch der schleswig-holsteinischen Landeskunde
1801 Schleswig-holsteinische Vaterlandskunde
1823 Nebenstunden für die innere Staatenkunde

Forestry
1791  Sammlungen zur Forstgeographie 
1814 Inbegriff der Forstwissenschaft
1820–1822 Vaterländische Waldberichte

References 

 

1761 births
1832 deaths
German foresters
Academic staff of the University of Kiel
People from Altona, Hamburg